St Francis FC (Seychelles) is a Seychelles-based football club which plays in the Seychelles League. The team is based in Baie Lazare on Mahe island.

Stadium
Currently, the team plays at the 10,000 capacity Stade Linité.

References

External links
Soccerway

Football clubs in Seychelles